There have been two baronetcies created for people with the surname Cholmeley, one in the Baronetage of England and one in the Baronetage of the United Kingdom. One creation is extant as of 2008. The family surname is pronounced "Chumley".

The Cholmeley Baronetcy, of Whitby in the County of York, was created in the Baronetage of England on 16 August for Hugh Cholmeley, Member of Parliament for Scarborough. During the English Civil War he fought as a Royalist as well as a Parliamentarian. The title descended from father to son until the early death of his grandson, the third Baronet, in 1665. The late Baronet was succeeded by his uncle, the fourth Baronet. He was Member of Parliament for Northampton and Thirsk. He had no sons and on his death in 1689 the title became extinct.

The Cholmeley Baronetcy, of Easton in the County of Lincoln, was created in the Baronetage of the United Kingdom on 4 March 1806 for Montague Cholmeley, subsequently Member of Parliament for Grantham. His son, the second Baronet, sat as Member of Parliament for North Lincolnshire. He was succeeded by his son, the third Baronet. He also represented Grantham in the House of Commons. His grandson, the fifth Baronet, was High Sheriff of Lincolnshire in 1961 and a Vice-Lord-Lieutenant and Deputy Lieutenant of the county. As of 2008, the title is held by his grandson, the seventh Baronet, who succeeded his father in 1998. The family seat was Easton Hall, Grantham, Lincolnshire, which was demolished in 1951.

The Cholmeley Baronets are the members of a junior branch of the Cholmondeley/Cholmeley family headed by the Marquess of Cholmondeley. In 1642 an ancestor of the first Baronet, Montague Cholmeley (born 1615), had a warrant for a baronetcy but the patent was never made out.

Cholmeley baronets, of Whitby (1641)
Sir Hugh Cholmeley, 1st Baronet (1600–1657)
Sir William Cholmeley, 2nd Baronet (1625–1663)
Sir Hugh Cholmeley, 3rd Baronet (–1665)
Sir Hugh Cholmeley, 4th Baronet (1632–1689)

Cholmeley baronets, of Easton (1806)

Sir Montague Cholmeley, 1st Baronet (1772–1831)
Sir Montague John Cholmeley, 2nd Baronet (1802–1874)
Sir Hugh Arthur Henry Cholmeley, 3rd Baronet (1839–1904)
Sir Montagu Aubrey Rowley Cholmeley, 4th Baronet (1876–1914)
Sir Hugh John Francis Sibthorp Cholmeley, 5th Baronet (1906–1964)
Sir Montague John Cholmeley, 6th Baronet (1935–1998)
Sir (Hugh John) Frederick Sebastian Cholmeley, 7th Baronet (born 1968)
The heir apparent is the present holder's son Montague Hugh Peter Cholmeley (born 1997).

Sir Frederick Sebastian Cholmeley is also a co-heir to the Earldom of Arlington and the Viscountcy of Thetford, along with his aunt and cousin. He is married to Ursula, daughter of High Court judge Sir Hugh Bennett.

Notes

References 
Kidd, Charles, Williamson, David (editors). Debrett's Peerage and Baronetage (1990 edition). New York: St Martin's Press, 1990.

 
Extinct baronetcies in the Baronetage of England
Baronetcies in the Baronetage of the United Kingdom
1641 establishments in England
1689 disestablishments in England
1806 establishments in the United Kingdom
Cholmondeley family